The following is a timeline of the COVID-19 pandemic in Guangdong for the year 2022.

January
On January 1, Guangdong Province reported 10 newly imported confirmed cases (2 of which were confirmed by asymptomatic infections), 7 cases were reported in Guangzhou, 5 cases were from France, 2 cases were from the United Kingdom; 1 case was reported from Shenzhen, from the United States ; Qingyuan reported 2 cases, both from Canada.

On January 2, there were 6 newly imported confirmed cases in Guangdong Province (2 of which were confirmed by asymptomatic infections), 4 cases were reported in Guangzhou, 2 cases were from Canada, and the remaining 2 cases were from Bolivia and Kenya; Foshan reported 2 cases example, from the United States and Bolivia.

On January 3, there were 13 newly imported confirmed cases in Guangdong Province (4 of which were confirmed by asymptomatic infections), and 7 cases were reported in Guangzhou, 3 cases were from Canada, 2 cases were from the United States, and the remaining 2 cases were from Australia and China. Ethiopia; Shenzhen reported 4 cases, all from the United States; Foshan reported 2 cases, respectively from the United Kingdom and Guatemala.

On January 4, 7 newly imported confirmed cases were confirmed in Guangdong Province (2 of which were transferred from asymptomatic infections), 5 cases were reported in Guangzhou, 3 cases were from Canada, and the remaining 2 cases were from France and Thailand; Shenzhen reported 1 Case, from the United States; Foshan reported 1 case, from Australia.

On January 5, Guangdong Province reported 10 newly imported confirmed cases, Guangzhou reported 9 cases, 7 cases were from the United States, and the remaining 2 cases were from Mexico and Singapore; Shenzhen reported 1 case, from Singapore

February
On February 2, there were 9 new local confirmed cases in Guangdong Province (3 of which were asymptomatic infections transferred to confirmed cases), 4 cases in Shenzhen, 1 case in Huizhou, and 4 cases in Yunfu; 1 new local asymptomatic infection case was added. Shenzhen Report. 4 newly imported confirmed cases, all reported from Guangzhou, came from Russia, Singapore, Bangladesh and Mongolia.

References

2022 in Guangdong
zh:2019冠状病毒病广东省疫情时间线 (2022年)